Zhangzhung or Shangshung was an ancient kingdom in western and northwestern Tibet, which pre-dates the culture of Tibetan Buddhism in Tibet. Zhangzhung culture is associated with the Bon religion, which has influenced the philosophies and practices of Tibetan Buddhism.  Zhangzhung people are mentioned frequently in ancient Tibetan texts as the original rulers of today's western Tibet. Only in the last two decades have archaeologists been given access to do archaeological work in the areas once ruled by the Zhangzhung.

Extent of the Zhangzhung kingdoms
Tradition has it that Zhangzhung consisted "of three different regions: sGob-ba, the outer; Phug-pa, the inner; and Bar-ba, the middle. The outer is what we might call Western Tibet, from Gilgit in the west to Dangs-ra khyung-rdzong in the east, next to lake gNam-mtsho, and from Khotan in the north to Chu-mig brgyad-cu rtsa-gnyis in the south. Ladakh, including Lahaul and Spiti, was part of sGob-ba. The inner region is said to be sTag-gzig (Tazig) [often identified with Bactria], and the middle rGya-mkhar bar-chod, a place not yet identified."  While it is not certain whether Zhangzhung was really so large, it was an independent kingdom and covered the whole of what is today's Western Tibet, Ladakh and Gilgit.

The capital city of Zhangzhung was called Khyunglung ( or ), the "Silver Palace of Garuda", southwest of Mount Kailash (Mount Ti-se),  which is identified with palaces found in the upper Sutlej Valley.

According to Rolf Alfred Stein, author of Tibetan Civilization, the area of Shang Shung was not historically a part of Tibet and was a distinctly foreign territory to the Tibetans:

History of the Zhangzhung

Iron Age culture of the Chang Tang—the Zhangzhung?
Recent archeological work on the Chang Tang plateau finds evidence of an Iron Age culture which some have tentatively identified as the Zhangzhung.

The Conquest of Zhangzhung

There is some confusion as to whether Central Tibet conquered Zhangzhung during the reign of Songtsen Gampo (605 or 617–649) or in the reign of Trisong Detsen, (r. 755 until 797 or 804). The records of the Tang Annals do, however, seem to clearly place these events in the reign of Songtsen Gampo for they say that in 634, Yangtong (Zhangzhung) and various Qiang tribes, "altogether submitted to him". Following this he united with the country of Yangtong to defeat the 'Azha or Tuyuhun, and then conquered two more tribes of Qiang before threatening Songzhou with an army of more than 200,000 men. He then sent an envoy with gifts of gold and silk to the Chinese emperor to ask for a Chinese princess in marriage and, when refused, attacked Songzhou. He apparently finally retreated and apologised and later the emperor granted his request.

Early Tibetan accounts say that the Tibetan king and the king of Zhangzhung had married each other's sisters in a political alliance. However, the Tibetan wife of the king of the Zhangzhung complained of poor treatment by the king's principal wife. War ensued, and through the treachery of the Tibetan princess, "King Ligmikya of Zhangzhung, while on his way to Sum-ba (Amdo province) was ambushed and killed by King Srongtsen Gampo's soldiers. As a consequence, the Zhangzhung kingdom was annexed to Bod (Central Tibet). Thereafter the new kingdom born of the unification of Zhangzhung and Bod was known as Bod rGyal-khab." R. A. Stein places the conquest of Zhangzhung in 645.

Revolt of Zhangzhung in 677
Zhangzhung revolted soon after the death of King Mangsong Mangtsen or Trimang Löntsän (r. 650–677), the son of Songtsen Gampo, but was brought back under Tibetan control by the "firm governance of the great leaders of the Mgar clan".

The Zhangzhung language

A handful of Zhangzhung texts and 11th century bilingual Tibetan documents attest to a Zhangzhung language which was related to Kinnauri. The Bonpo claim that the Tibetan writing system is derived from the Zhangzhung alphabet, while modern scholars recognize the clear derivation of Tibetan script from a North Indian script, which accords with non-Bon Tibetan accounts. 
A modern Kinnauri language called by the same name (pronounced locally Jangshung) is spoken by 2,000 people in the Sutlej Valley of Himachal Pradesh who claim to be descendants of the Zhangzhung.

Zhangzhung culture's influence in India
Bonpo tradition claims that Bon was founded by a Buddha-like figure named Tonpa Shenrab Miwoche, to whom are ascribed teachings similar in scope to those ascribed to the historical Gautama Buddha.  Bonpos claim that Tonpa Shenrab Miwoche lived some 18,000 years ago, and visited Tibet from the land of Tagzig Olmo Lung Ring, or Shambhala. 
Bonpos also suggest that during this time Lord Shenrab Miwoche's teaching permeated the entire subcontinent and was in part responsible for the development of the  Vedic religion.  An example of this link is said to be Mount Kailash, which is the center of Zhangzhung culture, and also the most sacred mountain to Hindus. As a result, the Bonpos claim that the supposedly much later Hindu teaching owes its origin – at least indirectly – to Tonpa Shenrab Miwoche.

See also

Zhangzhung Meri
History of Tibet
Shambala
Guge
Purang-Guge Kingdom

Footnotes

Sources 
 Allen, Charles. (1999) The Search for Shangri-La: A Journey into Tibetan History. Little, Brown and Company. Reprint: 2000 Abacus Books, London. .
 Bellezza, John Vincent: Zhangzhung. Foundations of Civilization in Tibet. A Historical and Ethnoarchaeological Study of the Monuments, Rock Art, Texts, and Oral Tradition of the Ancient Tibetan Upland. Denkschriften der phil.-hist. Klasse 368. Beitraege zur Kultur- und Geistesgeschichte Asiens 61, Verlag der Oesterreichischen Akademie der Wissenschaften, Wien 2008.
 Hummel, Siegbert. (2000). On Zhang-zhung. Edited and translated by Guido Vogliotti. Library of Tibetan Works and Archives. Dharamsala, H.P., India. .
 Karmey, Samten G. (1975). A General Introduction to the History and Doctrines of Bon.  Memoirs of the Research Department of the Toyo Bunko, No. 33, pp. 171–218. Tokyo.
 Stein, R. A. (1961). Les tribus anciennes des marches Sino-Tibétaines: légends, classifications et histoire. Presses Universitaires de France, Paris. (In French)
 Zeisler, Bettina. (2010). "Ëast of the Moon and West of the Sun? Approaches to a Land with Many Names, North of Ancient India and South of Khotan". In: The Tibet Journal, Special issue. Autumn 2009 vol XXXIV n. 3-Summer 2010 vol XXXV n. 2. "The Earth Ox Papers", edited by Roberto Vitali, pp. 371–463.

Further reading
 Bellezza, John Vincent. (2010). "gShen-rab Myi-bo, His life and times according to Tibet's earliest literary sources". Revue d'Etudes Tibétaines Number 19 October 2010, pp. 31–118.
 Blezer, Henk. (2010). "Greatly Perfected, in Space and Time: Historicities of the Bon Aural Transmission from Zhangzhung". In: The Tibet Journal, Special issue. Autumn 2009 vol XXXIV n. 3-Summer 2010 vol XXXV n. 2. "The Earth Ox Papers", edited by Roberto Vitali, pp. 71–160.
 Zeisler, Bettina (2010). "East of the Moon and West of the Sun? Approaches to a Land with Many Names, North of Northern India and South of Khotan". In: The Earth Ox Papers. Special Issue. The Tibet Journal, Autumn 2009 vol XXXIV n 3-Summer 2010 vol. SSSV n. 2. Edited by Roberto Vitali. Library of Tibetan Works and Archives, Dharamsala, H.P., India. pp. 371–463.

External links
Study Buddhism article on Bon and the Zhangzhung
Oral Tradition from Zhangzhung, An Introduction to the Bonpo Dzogchen Teachings of the Oral Tradition from Zhangzhung
 Expedition to Zhangzhung 

7th century in Tibet
Archaeological cultures of East Asia
Bon
Dzogchen
Former countries in Chinese history
History of Tibet
Iron Age Asia
Tibetan archaeology
Former kingdoms